The WWE Encyclopedia: The Definitive Guide to World Wrestling Entertainment is a reference book featuring in-depth knowledge surrounding the leading organization in professional wrestling, World Wrestling Entertainment (WWE).

The book covers the 45-year history of WWE and features a comprehensive A-Z listing of nearly 1,000 former and current wrestlers from as early as the 1960s to the present day. The book also contains official listings for title histories, television and pay-per-view events, most notably, a detailed history of WrestleMania.

More updated reissues of the book were released in 2012, 2016, and 2020.

Synopsis 
The WWE Encyclopedia: The Definitive Guide to World Wrestling Entertainment contains profiles for past and present WWE personalities, as well as event and title histories. While providing information primarily about the personalities career in WWE, information is also present about their careers in other companies. People who portrayed separate characters are often given separate profiles for each character.

People who left the company on bad terms were given favorable profiles, including Alundra Blayze and The Ultimate Warrior. Chris Benoit has a profile in the encyclopedia, however there is no mention of the double murder and suicide.

Writing 
Brian Shields and Kevin Sullivan (not the wrestler) created the book together. WWE was given final say over who would be included in the book. Overall, the book took over one year to create. Sullivan and Shields divided some of the work load, dividing the research for championship title histories in half.

Reception 
The book debuted at No. 10 on The New York Times Hardcover Books Bestsellers List and climbed as high as No. 8.

It received mostly favorable reviews. Bob Kapur of SLAM! Wrestling was favorable toward the book, saying that it "is just the ticket for fans looking for a trip down memory lane". He praised the book for including lesser known personalities, but also criticized the absence of notable tag teams such as Doug Furnas and Phil LaFon.

References

External links 
 Book Review: WWE Encyclopedia by Steven Wilson
 Book Review: WWE Encyclopedia by John McMullen
 The WWE Encyclopedia - a book review by Evan
 WWE Encyclopedia Book Review

WWE
2008 non-fiction books
Professional wrestling books
DK (publisher) books
American encyclopedias
21st-century encyclopedias
Specialized encyclopedias